Boden is an unincorporated community in Guernsey County, in the U.S. state of Ohio.

History
A post office was established at Boden in 1889, and remained in operation until it was discontinued in 1901. The community was named after William E. Boden, a state legislator.

References

Unincorporated communities in Guernsey County, Ohio
Unincorporated communities in Ohio